Yan Junqi (born August 1946) is a retired Chinese politician who was a vice chairwoman of the standing committee of the National People's Congress, and the chairwoman of the China Association for Promoting Democracy, a legally recognized non-Communist political party in China.

Biography
Yan was born in Wu County, Jiangsu Province (a present-day urban district of Suzhou), and graduated from the department of mechanical engineering at Shanghai Jiao Tong University. Her father died when she was six, and along with her other 4 siblings, she was raised by her mother in harsh conditions. After graduating from SJTU in August 1968, Yan was sent to work in Woniu Coal Mine in Xuzhou. After the Cultural Revolution, Yan was enrolled again in the department of mechanic engineering of SJTU in 1978 and obtained her master's degree in 1981. She then became a teacher at the university. Before long, Yan was sent to study in Denmark, and obtained her doctorate in the department of naval engineering of the school of mechanics at Technical University of Denmark in 1986.

Since returning to China, Yan had been teaching and doing research at SJTU and was elevated to become a member of a 7-person expert group of the "863 plan". She served as dean of the school of mechanical and power engineering and president assistant of SJTU. In 2000, Yan entered the government and became the vice director of the information office of the Shanghai municipal government. She was also elected vice chairwoman of the Shanghai committee of the China Association for Promoting Democracy. In 2001, Yan was appointed as vice mayor of Shanghai, responsible for science and technology, education and women and children's affairs. In June 2002, she was elected the chairwoman of the Shanghai committee of the China Association for Promoting Democracy. In December of the same year, Yan was elected vice chairwoman of the central committee of the China Association for Promoting Democracy in the first plenary session of the 9th national congress of CAPD.

On February 27, 2007, Yan resigned from the position of vice mayor of Shanghai. In April, she resigned as chairwoman of the CAPD Shanghai committee. In July 2007, she was transferred to Beijing and became the vice executive chairwoman of the central committee of the China Association for Promoting Democracy. Such a series of arrangements indicated Yan would soon take charge of the Association. Indeed, on December 7 of 2007, in the first plenary session of the 10th national congress of CAPD, Yan was elected the chairwoman of the China Association for Promoting Democracy.

Academic activities
Yan has long studied the Computer Integrated Manufacturing System (CIMS), and is an expert in CIMS and virtual manufacturing theory and technology in China. From 1987, she served as chief expert in the expert group of "863 plan", and organized five high-tech projects at the national level. She published over 50 academic papers, and edited and published 6 books.

Honors
Yan received numerous prizes and honors, including the National May 1 Labor Medal, Shanghai science and technology advancement prize 1st class and 2nd class, and sci. and tech. advancement prize of the national education commission. She also won the title of "National Young Expert with Outstanding Achievement", among other honors.

Family
The former president of the Republic of China, Yen Chia-kan, was Yan's family uncle, was also from Wuxian, Jiangsu ancestrally. Yen's offspring all bear the name "Jun". For example, his son, Yan Juntai was the general manager of Tangrong Company.

References

External links
Yan Junqi's profile at xinhuanet.com

1946 births
Living people
Chairperson and vice chairpersons of the Standing Committee of the 12th National People's Congress
Chinese women in politics
Members of the China Association for Promoting Democracy
People's Republic of China politicians from Jiangsu
Political office-holders in Shanghai
Politicians from Suzhou
Shanghai Jiao Tong University alumni